Kyrylo Melichenko (born 7 June 1999) is a Ukrainian professional footballer who plays as a defender  for Dynamo Dresden.

Career
Born in Kirovohrad Oblast, Melichenko began his career in the Kyiv's youth sportive schools, until his transfer to the FC Shakhtar youth sportive system in 2017.

He played in the Ukrainian Premier League Reserves and never made his debut for the senior Shakhtar Donetsk's squad. In August 2020 Melichenko signed one-year loan contract with the Ukrainian Premier League's debutant FC Mynai and made the debut for this team as a start squad player in a winning home match against FC Oleksandriya on 13 September 2020.

On 21 July 2022, he moved to 3. Liga club Dynamo Dresden.

References

External links
Profile at the Official UAF Site (Ukr)

1999 births
Living people
People from Svitlovodsk
Sportspeople from Kirovohrad Oblast]
Ukrainian footballers
Association football defenders
Ukraine youth international footballers
Ukrainian Premier League players
3. Liga players
FC Shakhtar Donetsk players
FC Mynai players
FC Mariupol players
Dynamo Dresden players
Ukrainian expatriate footballers
Ukrainian expatriate sportspeople in Germany
Expatriate footballers in Germany